Nettey is a Ghanaian surname. Notable people with the surname include:

 S. T. Nettey (1909–2007), Ghanaian politician
 Christopher Nettey (born 1998), Ghanaian footballer
 Jacob Nettey (born 1976), Ghanaian footballer
 Mansa Nettey, Ghanaian business and banking executive
 Emmanuel Nettey (born 1991), Ghanaian footballer
 Danny Nettey (1968–2016), Ghanaian musician and songwriter
 Christabel Nettey (born 1991), Canadian athlete

Ghanaian surnames